
Gmina Piątnica is a rural gmina (administrative district) in Łomża County, Podlaskie Voivodeship, in north-eastern Poland.

The gmina contains part of the protected area called Łomża Landscape Park.

Villages
Gmina Piątnica contains the villages and settlements of Budy Czarnockie, Budy-Mikołajka, Choszczewo, Czarnocin, Dobrzyjałowo, Drozdowo, Drożęcin-Lubiejewo, Elżbiecin, Gomulnik, Górki-Sypniewo, Górki-Szewkowo, Guty, Jeziorko, Kałęczyn, Kalinowo, Kisielnica, Kobylin, Kosaki, Kownaty, Kownaty-Kolonia, Krzewo, Kurpie, Marianowo, Motyka, Murawy, Nagórki, Niewodowo, Nowe Krzewo, Nowy Cydzyn, Olszyny, Olszyny-Kolonia, Pęza, Piątnica, Piątnica Włościańska, Poniat, Rakowo-Boginie, Rakowo-Czachy, Rządkowo, Stary Cydzyn, Stary Drożęcin, Taraskowo, Truszki, Wiktorzyn, Wyłudzin, Wyrzyki, Zabawka and Żelechy.

Neighbouring gminas
Gmina Piątnica is bordered by the city of Łomża and by the gminas of Jedwabne, Łomża, Mały Płock, Stawiski and Wizna.

References

 Polish official population figures 2006

Piatnica
Łomża County